Polerady is a municipality and village in Most District in the Ústí nad Labem Region of the Czech Republic. It has about 200 inhabitants.

History
The first written mention of Polerady is from 1250.

References

External links

Villages in Most District